TMNT is a hack and slash video game featuring the Teenage Mutant Ninja Turtles. It was developed by Ubisoft Montreal and published by Ubisoft for the Game Boy Advance. It is based on the 2007 film of the same name and was first released in North America on March 20, 2007, and was later released in Australia on March 22, 2007, and in Europe on March 23, 2007.

Another game with the same title was also released on the Xbox 360, Wii, PlayStation 2, GameCube, PC, Nintendo DS, and PlayStation Portable, though this version is vastly different from any of the others released, being a 2.5-D side-scrolling beat-'em-up game involving no three-dimensional gameplay - more in style of the original arcade installment.

Reception
The game has received very positive reviews. Craig Harris from IGN said about the game "it's easily one of the best brawling games I've played in years."

References

External links
 
 Teenage Mutant Ninja Turtles (Game Boy Advance) at MobyGames

2007 video games
Game Boy Advance games
Game Boy Advance-only games
Side-scrolling beat 'em ups
Ubisoft games
Video games based on films
Video games based on adaptations
Video games based on Teenage Mutant Ninja Turtles
Video games developed in Canada
Video games set in New York City
Teenage Mutant Ninja Turtles (1990 film series)